Armenian populations exist throughout the world. Although Armenian diaspora communities have existed since ancient times, most of the Armenians living outside of Armenia are descendants of the Armenian genocide survivors or recent immigrants from Armenia. According to various estimates, the total number of Armenians in the world is 7 to 9 million, with less than half living in Armenia and in the self-proclaimed de facto independent Artsakh Republic (Nagorno-Karabakh).

The tables below list countries and territories where Armenians live according to official data and estimates by various individuals, organizations, and media. See also Historical Armenian population, Armenian population by urban area, Armenian-speakers by country and List of Armenian ethnic enclaves.

Limitations
Estimates of ethnic Armenian populations may vary greatly because no reliable data is available for many countries. In France, Germany, Greece, Syria, Iran, Lebanon, among other countries, ethnicity has not been enumerated during any of the recent censuses and it is virtually impossible to determine the actual number of people of Armenian origin there. Although data for people of foreign origin (born abroad or having a foreign citizenship) is available for most European Union states, this does not present the whole picture and can hardly be taken as a source for the total number of Armenians, because in many countries, most prominently France, most ethnic Armenians are not from Armenia. Also, not all Armenian citizens and people born in Armenia are ethnic Armenians, but the overwhelming majority of them are as about 97.9% of the country's population is Armenian. For other countries, such as Russia, the official number of Armenians is believed, by many, to have been underrated, because many migrant workers live in the country.

Most recent data
The following table lists all sovereign countries (member states of the United Nations), states with limited recognition (or unrecognized states), and dependent territories for which any data of Armenian population is available.

Unspecified number

Countries with unspecified number
The following countries have Armenian populations of uncertain number; while population figures are not known definitively, Armenians are known to be present, even if relatively few:
Eurasia
  (Armenians in Azerbaijan): According to the 2009 census, 217 Armenians live in Azerbaijan (outside Nagorno-Karabakh). According to estimates, the number of Armenians in Azerbaijan ranges from very few (2018) to as many as 3,000 (2001), who conceal their Armenian identity.
 : "about 40 families"
 : "several hundred"
 : "a small number"
Africa

Countries with former or uncertain Armenian presence
The following countries previously had Armenian residents, but now record no Armenian population:
  (Armenians in Afghanistan)
 
  (Armenians in Indonesia)
  (Armenians in Myanmar)
  (Armenians in Pakistan)

References
Notes

Citations

Bibliography

 (archived)

Population by country